Dhanwan (Wealthy) also called Mazdoor Ki Beti is a 1937 Hindi social film. It was directed by Premankur Atorthy for Imperial Film Company. The film starred Rattan Bai, Hafisji, W. M. Khan, and Jamshedji. The music was composed by H. C. Bali. The film was loosely based on the story idea from Victor Hugo's The Hunchback of Notre Dame.

Cast
Rattan Bai
Hafisji
W. M. Khan
Jamshedji

Songs

"Ghar Se Bhoola Bhatka Musafir"
"Hamari Kaha Maano Babuji"
"Mohe Garwa Gaana Pada Babu"
"Gurbat Mein Zindagi Ka Koi Aasra Nahin"
"Raat Sooni Sajarya Pe Ho Devra"
"Jis Zaalim Se Yeh Aankh Ladi"
"Tere Pyaar Ne Loota Man Pyaare"
"Teri Bhakti Mein Bhagwan"

References

External links

1937 films
1930s Hindi-language films
Films directed by Premankur Atorthy
Indian black-and-white films